Mosharraf Hossain is a Jatiya Party (Ershad) politician and the former Member of Parliament of Laxmipur-4.

Career
Hossain was elected to parliament from Laxmipur-4 as a Jatiya Party candidate in 1988.

References

Jatiya Party politicians
Living people
4th Jatiya Sangsad members
Year of birth missing (living people)